Khandbari  is the district headquarters of Sankhuwasabha District in Province No. 1 of north-eastern Nepal. The 2011 Nepal census counted 26,301 population.

The area

A road connects Khandbari directly south to Biratnagar and the Terai. Khandbari will be soon connected with Kimmathanka and Tibet. Khandbari is fastest growing city and most developed among Hilly Region. It has established itself as a trading center for people of sankhuwasabha and some parts of Bhojpur districts.

Khandbari's reputed schools include Himalayan Higher secondary school ,Barun Secondary English School, Surya Higher Secondary Boarding School, Bagishwari Secondary School, Makalu English Boarding School and Sunshine English Secondary Boarding School.

Arun III Hydropower project is located nearby. Arun III Hydropower project is one of the major subjects that really matters to the residents.

A road has already been constructed that connects Khandbari directly to Biratnagar. Its border districts are Bhojpur, Solukhumbu, Taplejung, Terhathum and Dhankuta. The change in the political situation in the country has given much hope for the residents of the district for its rapid development.

The hospital in Khandbari is described as "comparatively well-equipped", and has received patients from surrounding areas arriving on foot or road and by chartered helicopters.

Among them one can also see spiny Babbler which is a species of bird only found in middle hills of Nepal. 

People can reach Khandbari by road and air transport.There are number of public Buses connecting khandbari with Dharan which is around 6 hours drive and also there are direct buses from Kathmandu to khandbari.
Air transport is provided through Tumlingtar Airport, which lies on the bank of Arun river. Every day, there are flights from Kathmandu and Biratnagar.

Media
To promote local culture, Khandbari has five FM radio stations:
 Guransh FM 107.5 MHz
 Sunkhari FM 91.4 MHz
 Naya abhiyan FM 99.00 MHz
 Khadbari FM 105.8 MHz
 Arun FM also

References

See also
 UN map of the municipalities of Sankhuwasabha District

Populated places in Sankhuwasabha District
Municipalities in Koshi Province
Nepal municipalities established in 1997
Municipalities in Sankhuwasabha District